Ahausen is a village in the district of Rotenburg, in Lower Saxony, Germany. Ahausen is administratively part of the collective community of Sottrum.

Attractions
The Evangelical Lutheran church is the village's landmark. The church was rebuilt in 1637 and again in 1848.

The Ahauser mill with its  mill pond is a popular tourist attraction.

Coat of arms
The Coat of Arms symbolizes the local church, the Wümme river and other local streams, and the nearby nature preserve known as "Wolf's Ground" (Wolfsgrund).

Geography
Ahausen is located 8 km. (5 miles) southwest of Rotenburg, 35 km. (22 miles) east of Bremen and 70 km. (44 miles) southwest of Hamburg. The Wümme river flows from east to west about 2 km. north of the center of Ahausen.

History
The first record of the village was in 1226 as "Ouhusen". Then Ahausen belonged to the Prince-Bishopric of Verden, established in 1180. The town was destroyed in the Thirty Years War (1618-1648) by the forces of Count Tilly. In 1648 the Prince-Bishopric was transformed into the Principality of Verden, which was first ruled in personal union by the Swedish Crown - interrupted by a Danish occupation (1712-1715) - and from 1715 on by the Hanoverian Crown. The Kingdom of Hanover incorporated the Principality in a real union and the Princely territory, including Ahausen, became part of the new Stade Region, established in 1823.

Intersections
Ahausen is 2 km. north of Federal Highway 215 and about 10 km. from Autobahns 1 and 27.

Nature
The area around Ahausen is heavily forested, and the many trails throughout are ideal for hiking. There are also large areas of nature preserve consisting of moorland/heath. Wolfsgrund is a well known preserve to the south.

References

External links
Official Website of Ahausen  (in German)

Municipalities in Lower Saxony
Rotenburg (district)